Brian "Howdy" Howard is a radio announcer, songwriter and firefighter from Tamworth, New South Wales. In 2006 he was inducted into the Australian Country Music Hall Of Fame and the Broadcasters Hall of Fame.

Career 
Howard's radio career began in 1980 with radio 2SER, where he remained until 1988 when he moved to 2TM in Tamworth on the famous Hoedown Radio Network. Howdy is the current breakfast presenter on 88.9FM Tamworth.

Howard is also a musician and singer. His songs have been recorded by many Australian country music recording artists including Gordon Parsons, Glenn Jones, Reg Poole and Christina George.

Personal life 
Howard has lived a "double life" working as a firefighter. Howard moved to Sydney, and graduated from Fire Brigade Training College at Paddington. He then worked at Randwick Fire Station from 1971. He became Captain of West Tamworth Fire Station five years after moving to Tamworth in 1988.

Awards

Tamworth Songwriters Awards
The Tamworth Songwriters Association (TSA) is an annual songwriting contest for original country songs, awarded in January at the Tamworth Country Music Festival. They commenced in 1986.
 (wins only)
|-
| 2013
| Brian Howard
| Tex Morton Award
| 
|-

References

External links 
 88.9FM Official website

Australian country singer-songwriters
Musicians from New South Wales
Australian radio personalities
Radio and television announcers
Living people
Year of birth missing (living people)
Australian male singer-songwriters